This list includes all types of constructions to lift or lower boats between two levels of a waterway, such as boat lifts, canal inclined planes, portage railways and water slopes, but excluding conventional locks.

Belgium
Canal du Centre lift No. 1 at Houdeng-Goegnies
Lifts on the old Canal du Centre: No. 2 at Houdeng-Aimeries, No. 3 at Strépy-Bracquegnies, No. 4 at Thieu
Strépy-Thieu boat lift at Thieu in the municipality of Le Rœulx
Ronquières inclined plane at Ronquières in the municipality of Braine-le-Comte

Canada

Trent–Severn boat lifts
Kirkfield Lift Lock
Peterborough Lift Lock
Big Chute Marine Railway
Swift Rapids Marine Railway (replaced in 1965 with a traditional boat lock)

China
 Danjiangkou dam boat lift, in Hubei Province, capable of lifting vessels of 450 tons displacement.
 Geheyan dam boat lift, also in Hubei Province, capable of lifting vessels of 300 tons displacement. The dam was completed in 1994, but technical difficulties delayed the opening of the ship lift for four more years.
 Longtan dam boat lift, capacity to lift vessels of 250 tons, in a basin 40×10.8×1.8 meters, and a vertical lift of 68.5 meters.
 Yantan Ship Lift
 Three Gorges Dam, boat lift (possibly complete July 2016) and staircase lock

France
Fontinettes boat lift
Fonsérannes water slope (near Béziers) on the canal du Midi
Montech water slope on the canal de Garonne
The inclined plane of Saint-Louis-Arzviller in Lorraine on the Canal de la Marne au Rhin

Germany
Kahnhebehaus Halsbrücke, also known as Rothenfurther Kahnhebehaus (tub boat lift house)
Kahnhebehaus Großvoigtsberg, also known as Christbescherunger Kahnhebehaus
Henrichenburg boat lift
Niederfinow boat lift
Rothensee boat lift
Scharnebeck twin ship lift

Japan

 Fushimi inclined plane on Biwako canal in Fushimi-ku, Kyoto (obsolete)
 Keage inclined plane on Biwako canal in Kyōto (obsolete)

Netherlands
Broekerhaven Overhaal

Poland
Elbląg inclined planes on the Elbląg Canal

Russia

 Krasnoyarsk inclined plane (electric rack railway) at the Krasnoyarsk hydroelectric dam

United Kingdom

Anderton Boat Lift
Blackhill Inclined Plane of the Monkland Canal
Bridgetown Incline on the Bude Canal
Brogborough Whirl proposed spiral inclined plane to navigate Brogborough Hill
Combe Hay Caisson lock
Camden Lock, William Congreve's hydropneumatic lock.
The inclined planes of Dukart's Canal
Falkirk Wheel
Foxton Inclined Plane (dismantled 1926, now remains only)
The boat lifts of the Grand Western Canal
Hay Inclined Plane
Hobbacott Incline on the Bude Canal
Kelpie boatlift, part of the Falkirk Helix project
The Inclined Plane of the Ketley Canal
Marhamchurch Incline on the Bude Canal
Merrifield Incline on the Bude Canal
Ridd Inclined Plane on the Rolle Canal
Tamerton Incline on the Bude Canal
Tardebigge Boat Lift
Vealand Incline on the Bude Canal
Trench Inclined Plane
Windmill Inclined Plane on the Shropshire Canal
Worsley Navigable Levels underground incline
Wrockwardine Wood Inclined Plane on the Shropshire Canal

United States
 The 23 inclined planes of the Morris Canal in New Jersey
 The inclined plane of the South Hadley Canal, Massachusetts
 The inclined plane of the Chesapeake and Ohio Canal
 The inclined planes of the Allegheny Portage Railroad connecting branches of the Pennsylvania Canal near Altoona, Pennsylvania
 They are also entering Lake Oswego, Oregon

References

Further reading

External links
 Belgian Canal du Centre page in French
 French boat lift page
 Canals and Waterways' Lifts and Inclined Planes Page
 International Canal Monuments List
 Broekerhaven Boat Lift
 Morris Canal Inclined Planes and Locks

 List of boat lifts

de:Schiffshebewerk#Liste der Schiffshebewerke